Peter Anderson (born 4 October 1933) is an Australian cricketer. He played eight first-class matches for New South Wales in 1966/67.

See also
 List of New South Wales representative cricketers

References

External links
 

1933 births
Living people
Australian cricketers
New South Wales cricketers
Cricketers from Melbourne